'English Russet' is an old cultivar of domesticated apple which keeps exceptionally well in storage. It is a russet apple that makes good cider, is used fresh, but is not very useful as a cooking apple. It has frequently been confounded with 'Golden Russet', which is sometimes known as 'English Golden Russet'.

See also
'Roxbury Russet'

References

Apple cultivars
Cider apples